Devprayag Legislative Assembly constituency is one of the 70 assembly constituencies of  Uttarakhand a northern state of India. Devprayag is part of Garhwal Lok Sabha constituency.

Members of Legislative Assembly
2012
2017 - Vinod Kandari (BJP)

Election results

2022

See also
 Garhwal (Lok Sabha constituency)

References

External links
 

Tehri Garhwal district
Assembly constituencies of Uttarakhand
2002 establishments in Uttarakhand
Constituencies established in 2002